Inquisitor variabilis is a species of sea snail, a marine gastropod mollusk in the family Pseudomelatomidae, the turrids and allies.

Description
The shell is yellowish brown, sometimes irregularly maculated with chestnut, with chestnut spots on a narrow band below the suture. The spire is long and turreted. It is slightly umbilicated. The large sinus is ascending.

Distribution
This marine species occurs off the Andaman Islands.

References

 Smith, E.A. (1877) Diagnoses of new species of Pleurotomidae in the British Museum. Annals and Magazine of Natural History, series 4, 19, 488–501
 Liu J.Y. [Ruiyu] (ed.). (2008). Checklist of marine biota of China seas. China Science Press. 1267 pp.

External links
 

variabilis
Gastropods described in 1877